Charles W. Upton (born c. 1943) is an American economist.

In 1974, Upton published together with Merton H. Miller a textbook, Macroeconomics: A Neoclassical Introduction, which is considered a landmark in modern macroeconomics.  The book was the first to put the neoclassical growth model at center stage, and the first place that in print discussed what has later become known as Ricardian Equivalence.  Written at the very dawn of the rational expectations–market-clearing revolution in macroeconomic theory, yet it provides a deeper understanding of those ideas than most contemporary texts.  The textbook also makes a radical break with IS-LM model and proposes an operationalizable alternative.  Like macroeconomic practice has evolved to 30 years later, much of the discussion in the book is built around a computer simulation model.  The computer simulation model resembles a deterministic version of a simple business cycle model.

Upton completed his undergraduate degree at Rice University and his Ph.D. at Carnegie Mellon University. He has held faculty positions at the University of Chicago, Rutgers University, and Kent State University.

Upton is a great admirer of Irving Fisher.

External links 
 Charles Upton's Homepage

Rice University alumni
Tepper School of Business alumni
University of Chicago faculty
Rutgers University faculty
Kent State University faculty
21st-century American economists
1940s births
Living people